Captain David Pentreath  (1933–26 June 2019) was an officer and pilot in the Royal Navy.   His commands included HMS Daring, HMS Brighton, HMS Plymouth and HMNB Clyde.  He fought in the Falklands War while commanding HMS Plymouth and took the surrender of Argentine forces on South Georgia in 1982.

References

1933 births
2019 deaths
Commanders of the Order of the British Empire
Companions of the Distinguished Service Order
Fleet Air Arm aviators 
Graduates of Britannia Royal Naval College
People educated at Haileybury and Imperial Service College
Royal Navy officers